Tatiana Chuvaeva (born 14 April 1983) is a Ukrainian former pairs skater. She competed with Viacheslav Chiliy and Dmytro Palamarchuk. With Palamarchuk, she was a two-time Ukrainian national champion and competed at the 2002 Winter Olympics, where they placed 16th. The partnership ended in 2003 with their retirement.

Programs 
(with Palamarchuk)

Competitive highlights

With Palamarchuk

With Chiliy

References

External links 
 

1983 births
Living people
Ukrainian female pair skaters
Figure skaters at the 2002 Winter Olympics
Olympic figure skaters of Ukraine
Sportspeople from Kyiv